SEPAC may refer to 

Small European Postal Administration Cooperation
Space Experiments with Particle Accelerators, see STS-45